This is a list of a selection of pubs in the city of Sheffield in South Yorkshire, England. Only a selection of pubs are listed, organised by district and postcode (in brackets). The oldest of Sheffield's pubs date back to the 18th century, although a few, notably The Kings Head in Attercliffe, operate from buildings that are considerably older.

Pubs in central Sheffield (S1 and S3)

 The Old Queen's Head, opened in the mid-19th century, is run from one of the oldest Grade II* listed buildings in Sheffield, dating from around 1475.
 The Museum is built on the site of the mortuary of the Sheffield Hospitals, with its vaulted ceilings still existing in the beer cellar today. The pub has gone through many name changes since its opening in 1897 when it first opened as The Museum. As the Orchard Square development was built around it, the pub changed its name to The Orchard, The Brewing Trough and The Hogshead, finally reverting to its original name in February 2005.
 The Brown Bear is one of the oldest pubs in the city centre and is a traditional two-roomed pub. It is housed in a Grade II listed building that dates from the late 18th century—predating most of the buildings in the surrounding area (which include the Town Hall). The pub features walls covered with theatre posters from the nearby Crucible Theatre and Lyceum Theatre and is one of three Sheffield Samuel Smith houses.
 The Adelphi Hotel was a pub in central Sheffield on the corner of Arundel Street and Sycamore Street, where the Crucible Theatre now stands. It is there that the Sheffield Wednesday Cricket Club was founded on Wednesday 4 September 1867 as well as the Yorkshire Cricket Club on 8 January 1863.
 The Frog and Parrot includes Sheffield's oldest brewery, in which the record-breaking Roger and Out beer was once brewed. The public house was refurbished into a late-night bar in 2011.
 The Yorkshire Grey, closed since 26 January 2006, first opened in 1833 as The Minerva. It was one of the four pubs on Charles St, where only one, The Roebuck Tavern, now remains. The pub was closed to provide Sheffield City Council's town hall a car park for its employees.
 The Washington, Fitzwilliam Street, is a traditional two-roomed pub. The pub was until recently co-owned by Nick Banks, the former Pulp drummer.
 The Grapes, Trippet Lane, is a small pub with an upstairs live music venue with a capacity of 60 which has had gigs by bands including the Arctic Monkeys, The Long Blondes and Maxïmo Park.
 The Fat Cat, 23 Alma Street. The oldest property deed dates from 1832 but it is not known if a pub was opened at that time. By 1852, the property was a pub then called the Kelham Island Tavern (now the name of a pub around the corner of Russell Street). It was then called The Battle of the Alma until 1981.
 The Kelham Island Tavern, Russell Street, is the only pub to have won CAMRA's National Pub of the Year award twice in a row.

Pubs in Highfield, Lowfield and Heeley (S2 and S8)

 The Sheaf House Hotel, Bramall Lane, opened in 1816. The Sheaf House sports ground, which used to be behind the pub, predates the Bramall Lane football ground and was used by both Yorkshire County Cricket Club and Sheffield Wednesday F.C.

 The Old Crown, London Road, is a former Tetley House which retains some original features, including the original Gilmour's ceramic tiles and attractive window arches.

 The Cremorne, London Road, is an early nineteenth-century pub. As a former coaching house, the pub features a gated archway to the side and more buildings to the rear. It is 300 metres from Bramall Lane
 The Barrel Inn, London Road, is one of three pubs in Sheffield to share this name. This one was built in 1882 and is a former Ward's pub, still bearing Ward's flags.

 The Sheaf View Inn, Gleadless Road, opened as a pub in 1879 but had a licence to sell only beer and cider until 1978 due to the toilets being outside at the back of the yard. The building was refurbished in 2000 and opened on 24 May 2000 as a real-ale pub and is run by New Barrack Tavern. Due to its real-ale orientation, and as a "proper" traditional pub, under-18s are not allowed inside (apart from the toilets).
 The White Lion, London Road, operates from a Grade II listed building and has been a public house since 1781.

Pubs in Hillsborough (S6)
Sport Shack, 12 Holme Lane, the brand's second sports bar opening. Formerly a bridal shop, owners Danny Grayson & James Dobson have transformed the unit into a sports bar. It is home to 8 TV's showing the latest from SKY and BT Sport. The bar opened in February 2019 with manager Luke Powell-Pepper at the helm.
The Rawson Spring, Hillsborough Corner, a large Wetherspoon chain pub situated within the building of the former Walkley and Hillsborough District Baths, and until 2007 was aptly called The Deep End. A large outdoor area with an external bar was added in 2014. The pub can become very busy and congested on days when Sheffield Wednesday are at home.
 The Riverside, Walkley Lane, known as the Freemason's Arms until 2013 when it was taken over by a chain.

Pubs in Nether Edge (S7 and S11)

 The Union, Nether Edge
 Byron House, Nether Edge
 The Broadfield, Abbeydale Road
 The Stag, Psalter Lane
 Fox House is a former coach house on Hathersage Road. It is named after Mr Fox of Callow Farm in Highlow rather than the small animal. The limestone building was built in 1773 and extended in the 1840s by the landlord of the time, the Duke of Rutland.

Pubs in Abbeydale and Millhouses (S7)

 The Millhouses, Abbeydale Road
The Robin Hood dates from at least the early 19th century.
 The Waggon and Horses is housed in a pre-19th-century farmhouse of unknown age. A tea room was built alongside in the 1920s and the farm outbuildings converted into a garage. The tea room has since been integrated into the pub and the outbuildings demolished.

Pubs in Woodseats and Norton (S8)
Sport Shack, Chesterfield Road, was formerly a Greggs bakery and a charity shop. The building has had a dramatic transformation to become Woodseats first sports bar. The brand owned by Danny Grayson and James Dobson operate 2 other venues in Sheffield, located in Hillsborough and Ecclesall Road.
The Woodseats Palace, Chesterfield Road, was formerly a cinema, opened in 1911. It was then used as supermarkets (Fine Fare, Kwik Save, Alldays) and is now a Wetherspoons free house.
 The Chantrey Arms, Chesterfield Road, named after sculptor Francis Chantrey who was born nearby in Norton.
 The Woodseats Hotel, Chesterfield Road, made the national news when Firkin Brewery changed its name to The Floozey and Firkin. Closed circa 2009, now an Indian restaurant Viraaj. 
 The Big Tree, Chesterfield Road, was once called Masons Arms but has been named The Big Tree since 1936, with the exception of a short period in the 1980s under the Brewburgers brand. The large tree after which the pub was named died after becoming diseased. The pub was referred to in the Sheffield Telegraph in 1906 as the "Mason's Arms, known locally as The Big Tree".
 The Abbey, Chesterfield Road, has a trapezoidal bowling green and is one of the last pubs in Sheffield to retain its bowling facilities.
 The Cross Scythes, Derbyshire Lane, once had a collection of rare animals in an area behind the building which was promoted as a zoo.
 The Magpie, Lowedges Road, Lowedges, was Large estate pub built in the mid-1950s, closed circa 2010, now a supermarket and fast food outlet.
 The Grennel Mower, Lowedges Road, is at the bus terminus (routes 53, 75 and 76).

Pubs in Attercliffe (S9)

 The Kings Head is in a building that was the home of Benjamin Huntsman.
 Carbrook Hall, Attercliffe Common, is in a Grade II* listed building that dates from circa 1620. It claims to be "Sheffield's most haunted public house". Now closed, converted to a Starbucks.

Pubs in Handsworth (S9 and S13)
 The Chantry Inn (400 Handsworth Road) is one of four pubs in the UK built on holy ground (that of the neighbouring Saint Mary's Church). It is a very old building, but it has not always been a public house. The original structure was built in the mid-13th century though extensive re-building and modifications have occurred over its history. Initially, it was used as a Church House for the chaplains and lay clerks attached to Saint Mary's Church. Later it was further modified and became a school and, finally, in 1804, it was granted an ale licence and became a public house.

 The Turf Tavern (336 Handsworth Road) was originally attached to the old village smithy (demolished in 1926 during the construction of Laverack Street). Records show that it was already registered as a beerhouse in 1833.

Pubs in Crosspool and Lodge Moor (S10)
 The Three Merry Lads (610 Redmires Road) originally a farm but was converted into a pub circ. 1837. It was owned by the Marsden family and was named after their three sons.
 The Bell Hagg (3 Manchester Road) was originally built as a folly ("Hodgson's Folly") in 1832. It is a 5-storey structure built into the steep hillside of the Rivelin Valley. The Bell Hagg closed permanently in 2005.
 The Crosspool Tavern (469 Manchester Road). The first Crosspool Tavern had originally been Mr. Joseph Sarson's cottage and workshop. He died shortly after its conversion to a tavern in 1824. The property remained in the family for over 100 years, and Sarson's widow ran the premises until the mid-1870s. It became a meeting place for the district and had its own skittle alley. The tavern was totally rebuilt in 1930 and the last member of the Sarson family to run it retired in 1935, having held the licence for 40 years.

 The Plough Inn (288 Sandygate Road) was originally constructed in 1695 but the current structure resulted from rebuilding in 1927. It became the base for the Hallam Cricket Club.

 The Shiny Sheff, Crimicar Lane, Lodge Moor.

Pubs in Dore, Totley and Bradway (S17)

 The Cross Scythes, Baslow Road, once called Ye Olde Cross Stythes, is housed in one of the oldest buildings in Totley, around 300 years old. It was probably named after the landlord's secondary profession. The pub is exactly six miles away from Sheffield and Baslow and was often referred to as Halfway House. It is an extension of an old barn facing the old village green.
 The Crown Inn, Hillfoot Road, Totley. The Crown is the oldest pub in Totley and was converted to a beer house in 1727 when the main road from Sheffield to London ran past outside the establishment. The first recorded reference to The Crown Inn is in 1813 when a Dorothy Dalton ran the pub. She is said to have taken over when her husband, George, a firebrick maker, died in the 1830s. Her eldest son, Thomas, took over. In the mid-19th century, a new turnpike, Baslow Road, was built which left The Crown out of the area of patronage. The pub benefited shortly afterwards from trade provided by the men building the Totley Tunnel. In between opening times landlords generally had to supplement their income by working as scythe makers or farmers.
 The Fleur de Lys (now closed), Totley Hall Lane, is large mock half-timbered building built in 1933. The new pub replaces the now roofless old pub. Two houses next to the pub were demolished in the 1980s to make place for the new residential estate and pub car park. The old pub was situated near the village where the village's stocks were, hence the former name of Totley Hall Lane, Stocks Green. The name of the pub derives from the iris of the coat of arms of the Barker family, living in Totley Hall.
 The Cricket Inn, Penny Lane, Totley Bents, was originally a farmhouse. It was opened as a pub during the construction of the nearby Totley Tunnel. It is now operated as a gastropub by BrewKitchen, selling beer from Thornbridge Brewery. Cricket matches take place on a cricket ground at the rear.
 The Devonshire Arms, High Street, was built in the 18th century. It stands on the site of a public water trough. It has been the meeting place of many local societies and was extended following the demand made by the Dore Village Society. The society suggested the brewery opened the rear of The Devonshire Arms as a heritage centre. The brewery, liking the idea, renovated the derelict building and used it as an extension to the pub.
 The Hare & Hounds, Church Street, is an early 17th-century limestone public house in the village in Dore. The pub is divided into several rooms due to later extensions. The building was neighboured by Sam Thorpe's grocery, corn and provision dealer to the east until the store was destroyed to make place for new shops and the pub's car park.
 The Dore Moor Inn on Hathersage Road, was originally The Devonshire Arms. It was in this pub that the Dore Old School board of trustees hired Richard Furness as master in 1821. The establishment was renamed The Dore Moor Inn between then and 1906. Like The Peacock on Owler Bar, The Dore Moor Inn was a popular Sunday outing venue from Sheffield by the 1850s.
 The Shepley Spitfire, Mickley Lane.

 The Old Mother Redcap is one of only three pubs owned by the Samuel Smith Brewery in Sheffield, the others being The Red Grouse (Stocksbridge) and The Brown Bear (city centre).
 The Peacock Inn, Owler Bar, Totley Moor.

Pubs in Birley, Gleadless, Gleadless Townend, Frecheville, Hackenthorpe, Intake, and Ridgeway (S12)
Carlton Social Club, 896 Gleadless Road, Gleadless Townend
Red Lion Inn, 972 Gleadless Road, Gleadless Townend
Steelers Sports Bar,  2A Birley Moor Road, Birley
The Birley, Birley Moor Road, Birley
The Sherwood, Birley Moor Road, Birley
The Fairway, Birley Wood, Birley
The Jack in a Box, 111 Silkstone Road, Birley
The Hogs Head, 133 Delves Road, Hackenthorpe
The Golden Plover, 45 Spa View Road, Hackenthorpe
The Sportsman Inn, Main Street, Hackenthorpe
The Noah's Ark, 197 Mansfield Road, Intake
The Foxwood Embassy, 57 Mansfied Road, Intake
The Ball Inn, 43 Mansfield Road, Intake
The Bridge Inn, 3-5 The Ford, Ridgeway
The Swan, Main Road, Ridgeway,
The Queens Head, 12 Main Road, Ridgeway
The Phoenix, 2 High Lane, Ridgeway

Pubs in Mosborough, Halfway and Beighton (S20)
The Vine, School Street, Mosborough - The Vine has now closed and is currently an Indian Restaurant
The Royal Oak, High Street, Mosborough
The Queen Hotel, High Street, Mosborough
The George & Dragon, High Street, Mosborough
The British Oak, Mosborough Moor, Mosborough - True North Brew Co. owned pub serving various different alcoholic & soft drinks with "Gastro" style food menu also serving Sunday dinner's and outside pizza oven during the summer months. Often host events such as Gin night's and the annual "Oakfest"
The Alma, South Street, Mosborough
The Ridgeway Arms, Quarry Hill, Mosborough
Mosborough Miners Welfare, Station Road, Mosborough
The Double Top, Halfway Drive, Halfway - The Double Top is now closed and for sale
The Gypsy Queen, Drake House Lane, Beighton
The Fox, 1 Robin Lane, Beighton
The Belfry, Eckington Road, Beighton
The Cumberland, 35 High Street, Beighton
Beighton Welfare, 52A High Street, Beighton
Beighton Top Club, Social Club, Manvers Road, Beighton

Pubs in Killamarsh (S21)
Although actually in Derbyshire, these pubs are included due to their close proximity to Sheffield and their listing on several of the city's pub guides.
The Midland, Sheffield Road, has undergone recent management changes and regularly hosts live bands and jam nights.
The Steelmelters, Netherthorpe Lane.
The Crown Inn, Ashley Lane.
The Nags Head, Westthorpe Road, spacious pub which hosts live events and karaoke nights.
The West End Hotel, Westthorpe Road, has a large outdoor beer garden and play area, famous for rotating cask ales and houses a large amount of ornaments and memorabilia from around the world.
 Travelers Rest, Mansfield Road.

Pubs on Ecclesall Road (S11) 
 Sport Shack, 271 Ecclesall Road. Sheffield's first "Micro Sports Bar" opened in September 2018. The founders Danny Grayson & James Dobson have since opened up 2 further Sport Shack units in Hillsborough and Woodseats.
 The Porter Brook, a managed house owned and operated by Greene King.
 Monk Bar
 The Lost and Found
 The Ale Club
 The Beer House
 The Nursery Tavern
 The Portland House
 Honeycomb Bar & Restaurant
 The Sheaf Island
 The Itchy Pig Banner Cross

See also
 Public houses
 List of bars
 List of pubs in the United Kingdom
 List of public house topics

References

Notes

Bibliography
 Heeley and Thereabouts... Including Meersbrook and Norton Lees, 2004, Heeley History Workshop. .
 Sheffield, Emerging City, 1969, Sheffield City Council.

External links

 Sheffield Pub Guide

Buildings and structures in Sheffield
Culture in Sheffield
Pubs in Yorkshire
Pubs in Sheffield
Sheffield
Pubs